is a national highway of Japan in Okayama Prefecture that connects the cities of Bizen and Takahashi.

See also

References

External links

484
Roads in Okayama Prefecture